John's equation is an ultrahyperbolic partial differential equation satisfied by the X-ray transform of a function. It is named after Fritz John.

We will parameterise the lines by pairs of points ,  on each line and define  as the ray transform where

Such functions  are characterized by John's equations

which is proved by Fritz John for dimension three and by Kurusa for higher dimensions.

In three-dimensional x-ray computerized tomography John's equation can be solved to fill in missing data, for example where the data is obtained from a point source traversing a curve, typically a helix.

More generally an ultrahyperbolic partial differential equation (a term coined by Richard Courant) is a second order partial differential equation of the form

where , such that the quadratic form

can  be reduced by a linear change of variables to the form 

It is not possible to arbitrarily specify the value of the solution on a non-characteristic hypersurface. John's paper however does give examples of manifolds on which an arbitrary specification of u can be extended to a solution.

References

 Á. Kurusa, A characterization of the Radon transform's range by a system of PDEs, J. Math. Anal. Appl., 161(1991), 218--226. 
 S K Patch,  Consistency conditions upon 3D CT data and the wave equation, Phys. Med. Biol. 47 No 15 (7 August 2002) 2637-2650 

Partial differential equations